Marry Me Again is a 1953 comedy film written and directed by Frank Tashlin. It stars Robert Cummings and Marie Wilson.

Plot
Bill has an unusual dilemma when he returns home from the war in Korea, where he had been a pilot. Out of pride, he wants to provide the sole support for Doris and their family, but Doris isn't sure what to do because she has just inherited a fortune.

Cast
 Robert Cummings as Bill
 Marie Wilson as Doris
 Ray Walker as Mac
 Mary Costa as Joan
 Jess Barker as Jenkins
 Lloyd Corrigan as Mr. Taylor
 June Vincent as Miss Craig
 Richard Gaines as Dr. Pepperdine
 Moroni Olsen as Mr. Courtney
 Frank Cady as Dr. Day

Production
The film was announced in March 1953 based on a story by producer Alex Gottlieb with Windsor and Cummings attached from the beginning. Gottlieb made the film independently for RKO. Filming started June 9, 1953.

Release
Marry Me Again premiered at the Oprheum Theatre in Seattle on September 23, 1953 and grossed $5,000 in one week. It was released nationally October 22, 1953.

References

External links
 
 

1953 films
Films directed by Frank Tashlin
Films with screenplays by Frank Tashlin
Films scored by Raoul Kraushaar
American comedy films
1953 comedy films
American black-and-white films
1950s English-language films
1950s American films